The Beaver River is a  river in Lake County, Minnesota. It flows into Lake Superior.

Habitat
Portions of Beaver River are designated trout streams with populations of brook, brown, and rainbow trout.

See also
List of rivers of Minnesota

References

Rivers of Minnesota
Tributaries of Lake Superior
Rivers of Lake County, Minnesota
Northern Minnesota trout streams